Hercules was launched at the Province of Georgia in 1777. She appeared in Lloyd's Register in 1782 as a West Indiaman. From 1786 she made three voyages as a slave ship. She was lost as she was returning to England after having delivered her slaves at Jamaica.

Career
Hercules appeared in Lloyd's Register  in 1782 with Jn Lang, master and owner, and trade Tortola–London. In 1783 her master was J. Lang, her owner Crawford, and her trade London–Antigua.

In 1786 Lloyd's Register showed Hercules with Ar[thur] Bold, master, Barber & Co., owner, and trade London–Africa. she had undergone repairs in 1783.

Slave voyage #1 (1786–1788): Captain Arthur Bold sailed from London on 26 April 1786. Hercules started gathering slaves on 13 July 1786, first at Anomabu, then at Cape Coast Castle, and finally at Dixcove. She left Africa on 26 March 1788 arrived at Dominica on 26 May8. There she landed 370 slaves, having embarked 400, for a death rate of 7%. She left Dominica on 28 June, and arrived back at London on 20 August.

Slave voyage #2 (1789–1791): Hercules underwent repairs in 1789. Captain John Knox sailed from London on 23 July 1789 and gathered her slaves at Iles de Los. She arrived at Dominica 25 February 1791, where she landed 445 slaves. She sailed from Dominica on 28 April and arrived at Liverpool on 5 June.

Slave voyage #3 (1791–Loss): Hercules underwent repairs in 1791. Captain William Forbes sailed from Liverpool on 17 December 1791. She stopped at Glasgow, and then gathered her slaves at Bonny and arrived at Jamaica on 18 September 1792. There she landed 276 slaves. At some point Captain John Brelsford replace Forbes. She left London with 38 crew members and suffered 12 crew deaths on her voyage.

Lloyd's List reported on 5 February 1793 that Hercules was lost on the island of Cuba as she was sailing from Jamaica.

Citations

1777 ships
Ships built in the United States
Age of Sail merchant ships of England
London slave ships
Liverpool slave ships
Maritime incidents in 1792